Following are the statistics of the Libyan Premier League for the 1985–86 season.  The Libyan Premier League is the highest division of Libyan football championship, organised by Libyan Football Federation.  It was founded in 1963 and features mostly professional players.

Overview
16 teams were split into two groups, depending on their geographic location. Top two teams in each group advanced to the semifinals.

Teams

Group A (East) 
Afriqi
Akhdar
Al-Ahly Benghazi
Hilal
Nasr
Tahaddy
Suqoor

Group B (West) 
Al-Ahl Tripoli
Shabab al Arabi
Dhahra
Madina
Mahalla
Olomby
Wahda
Sweahly
Ittihad Tripoli

Playoff

Semifinal
Al-Ahly (Benghazi) 0-1 ; 0-0 Al-Ittihad (Tripoli)
Al-Ahl (Tripoli) 6-2 ; 2-3 Al-Nasr (Benghazi)

Final
Al-Ittihad (Tripoli) 2-1 Al-Ahly (Tripoli)

References
Libya - List of final tables (RSSSF)

Libyan Premier League seasons
1
Libya